Ek Kasak Reh Gayi is a Pakistani drama serial written by K Rehman and directed by Dilawar Malik. It stars Mikaal Zulfiqar, Sanam Saeed and Javed Shaikh in lead roles. The drama was first aired on 16 September 2013 on Geo Entertainment, where it aired every Monday and Tuesday at 9:00 P.M.

Cast
Sanam Saeed as Paras
Mikaal Zulfiqar as Sheharyaar
Javed Shaikh as Taya
Sarah Khan
Naila Jaffri as Ammi
Taifoor Khan as Sarmad
Hina Khawaja Bayat as Bia
Azra Mohyeddin as Amma
Mahek Ali as Rania
Mohsin Gilani as Papa

Broadcast
The series originally released on Geo Entertainment in late 2013 as a bi-weekly drama series. Later, series was also aired on Geo Kahani, a sister channel of Geo Entertainment.

In 2016, the serial was aired on Zindagi in India. Later in 2021, it was released on an OTT platform, Zee5 for streaming across 190 countries.

References

External links
 Ek Kasak Reh Gayi-IMDb

Geo TV original programming
Pakistani drama television series
Urdu-language television shows
2013 Pakistani television series debuts
2013 Pakistani television series endings